Marco Antonio de Mattos Filho (born 3 July 1986 in Passo Fundo), commonly known as Marquinho, is a Brazilian footballer. Mainly an attacking midfielder who plays for Figueirense, he can also play as a left wingback.

Career

Brazil
Marquinho started his career at Gaúcho, playing for other Rio Grande do Sul-based youth clubs until he was transferred to Vasco da Gama and later to Palmeiras. During his time at Palmeiras, he was promoted to the first team in 2007 after his manager threatened not to renew Marquinho's contract since he acted only in Palmeiras B without first team opportunities.

His first game in the first team was on January 18, 2007 in a 4–2 win at Campeonato Paulista. He also played at Brasileirão against Goiás in August 2007 before moving to Botafogo. In 2008, after being discharged from the Rio de Janeiro club, he was signed by Figueirense, being a member of the starting eleven and moving to Fluminense the following year. At the end of 2009, after a long battle against relegation, Marquinho scored in the 1-1 away draw against Coritiba in the last league match, a result that kept Fluminense at Série A and relegated Coritiba to Série B. In 2010, he was part of the team that led Fluminense to win the national title after 26 years.

Roma
Marquinho moved to Roma on 31 January 2012 on a six-month loan. He made his debut on 19 February against Parma and scored his first goal on 1 April in a 5–2 win against Novara. He scored a goal against Udinese on 11 April 2012, and one more against Napoli two weeks later.
At the end of a very impressive spell at Roma, they officially signed the midfielder for a reportedly €3 million from Fluminense.

He scored his first goal of the season against Inter on 2 September 2012 in a 3–1 victory. He scored his second goal of the season in a 4–2 loss against Cagliari. He finished the season with 26 appearances and 4 goals.

On 31 January 2014, Marquinho moved to league rivals Hellas Verona on loan for the remainder of the 2013–14 season.

Al-Ittihad

On 2 July 2014, the Jeddah-based team Ittihad FC announced the signing of Marquinho on a season long loan from A.S. Roma for undisclosed fee. He performs very well with Ittihad FC and scored 8 goals in 14 league matches. On May 15, 2015 following the derby match against Al-Ahli, Marquinho left Saudi Arabia.

Fluminense return
On 14 July 2016, Marquinho joined Fluminense on a three-year contract.

Atlético Paranaense
On 3 September 2018, Marquinho signed a contract with Atlético Paranaense until June 2019.

Vasco da Gama
In June 2019, Marquinho joined Vasco da Gama.

Honours
Figueirense
Campeonato Catarinense: 2008

Fluminense
Campeonato Brasileiro Série A: 2010

Al-Ahli
Saudi Professional League: 2015–16
King Cup: 2016

References

External links

1986 births
Living people
People from Passo Fundo
Sportspeople from Rio Grande do Sul
Brazilian footballers
Association football midfielders
Botafogo de Futebol e Regatas players
Sociedade Esportiva Palmeiras players
Figueirense FC players
Fluminense FC players
Club Athletico Paranaense players
CR Vasco da Gama players
A.S. Roma players
Hellas Verona F.C. players
Udinese Calcio players
Ittihad FC players
Al-Ahli Saudi FC players
Campeonato Brasileiro Série A players
Campeonato Brasileiro Série B players
Campeonato Brasileiro Série C players
Serie A players
Saudi Professional League players
Brazilian expatriate footballers
Brazilian expatriate sportspeople in Italy
Brazilian expatriate sportspeople in Saudi Arabia
Expatriate footballers in Italy
Expatriate footballers in Saudi Arabia